Kannamangalam is a village in  Mavelikkara Taluk in Alappuzha district in the Indian state of Kerala. It lies in Chettikulangara Grama Panchayath. Kannamangalam Mahadeva temple is the main landmark of the village. The deity of the temple is Lord Shiva. The temple is believed to be built by Kanvamahirshi. Kannamangalam Mahadevar is believed to be the father of Chettikulangara Devi. On the day of Shivarathri, Devi comes to meet her father and her devotees.

Notable junctions

Chettikulangara
Karippuzha
Kochickal
Panachammodu
Puthisseriambalam
Kadavoor
Cherukara
Vadakkethundam
Kavunginvila
Altharamoodu
Hospital
Chettikulangara panchayat hospital
Markets
Chettikulangara market
Karippuzha market
Nearest villages
Peringala
Thekkekkara
Pathiyoor

Demographics
In the 2001 India census, Kannamangalam had a population of 23,173 with 11,071 males and 12,102 females.

References

Villages in Alappuzha district